The Flying Fifty-Five may refer to:

 The Flying Fifty-Five (1924 film), a British silent sports film
 Flying Fifty-Five, a 1939 British sports drama film